Antoine Lox (14 March 1900 – 25 February 1982) was a Belgian racing cyclist. He rode in the 1928 Tour de France.

References

1900 births
1982 deaths
Belgian male cyclists
Place of birth missing